= Ugo Passigli =

Italian physician

Ugo Passigli (born 14 December 1867) was an Italian physician. Born in Sienna, he studied medicine at the Reale istituto di studi superiori in Florence. As of 1904, he was working in the health department of that city. He contributed many articles to scientific and literary journals, and published numerous pamphlets on medical subjects.

== Selected publications ==
- Della circoncisione sotto il punto di vista profilattico e terapeutico. Florence. 1895.
- Un' antica pagina d'igiene alimentare. Florence. 1896.
- Dermosifilopatia biblica, o le malattie veneree presso gli Ebrei. Milan: P. Tamborini. 1898.
- L'allattamento, saggio di pediatria biblica. Bologna: Gamberini e Parmeggiani. 1898.
- Un po' d'igiene del passato: la nettezza del corpo e delle vestimente presso gli Ebrei. Forli: Democratica. 1898.
- La prostituzione e le psicopatie sessuali presso gli Ebrei all'epoca biblica. Milan: P. Tamborini. 1898.
- Le cognizioni ostetrico-ginecologiche degli antichi Ebrei. Bologna: Gamberini e Parmeggiani. 1898.
- Le vacanze di un medico. Florence. 1902.
- Le disinfezioni e le altre misure profilattiche nel passato contro le malattie infettive. Prato. 1902.
